Dzoraghbyur is a village in the Kotayk Province of Armenia. "Dzoraghbyur" translates roughly to English as "Canyon Fountain". It is located 10 km east of Yerevan and 35 km south of the regional centre Hrazdan.

The Dzoraghbyur Training Centre of FC Ararat Yerevan is located in the village of Dzoraghbyur.

See also 
Kotayk Province

References 

World Gazeteer: Armenia – World-Gazetteer.com

Populated places in Kotayk Province